The Americas Zone was one of the three zones of the regional Davis Cup competition in 2016.

In the Americas Zone there were three different tiers, called groups, in which teams competed against each other to advance to the upper tier. Winners in Group I advanced to the World Group Play-offs, along with losing teams from the World Group first round. Teams who lost their respective ties competed in the relegation play-offs, with winning teams remaining in Group I, whereas teams who lost their play-offs were relegated to the Americas Zone Group II in 2017.

Participating nations

Seeds: 
All seeds received a bye into the second round. 

Remaining nations:

Draw

 relegated to Group II in 2017.
 and  advance to World Group Play-off.

First round

Ecuador vs. Barbados

Chile vs. Dominican Republic

Second round

Brazil vs. Ecuador

Chile vs. Colombia

First round playoffs

Dominican Republic vs. Colombia

Second round playoffs

Dominican Republic vs. Barbados

References

External links
Official Website

Americas Zone Group I
Davis Cup Americas Zone